

World Championships

The World Road Championships were held in Salzburg, Austria, from 21 to 28 September 2006.

Grand Tours

UCI Pro Tour

2.HC Category Races

1.HC Category Races

UCI tours

Continental Championships

African Championships

Asian Championships

European Championships (under-23)

Oceania Championships

Pan American Championships

International Games

Asian Games

Central American and Caribbean Games

Commonwealth Games

South American Games

South Asian Games

National Championships

UCI Teams

UCI ProTeams

UCI Professional Continental and Continental teams

References

See also
2006 in women's road cycling

 
Men's road cycling by year